Prince Oddone of Savoy, Duke of Montferrat (Oddone Eugenio Maria; 11 July 1846 – 22 January 1866) was an Italian humanist and philanthropist and member of the Royal House of Savoy. He was the fourth child and third eldest son of King Victor Emmanuel II of Italy and his wife Adelaide of Austria.

Life

Born with a serious genetic disease, from the age of two he showed severely debilitating symptoms (dwarfism and developmental deformity); he was therefore placed on the margins of the court life of the House of Savoy due to poor health. Endowed with uncommon intelligence, resourcefulness and intellectual liveliness, he therefore dedicated himself to studying, taking an interest in his short existence in various subjects, both scientific and artistic.

During his brief life, the prince was occupied with the study of art and the acquisition of artifacts from ancient Greece and Rome for the city of Genoa, which remain in the Museum of Ligurian Archaeology. 
Other pieces Oddone collected and donated are present at Genoa's Gallery of Modern Art, which is partly named for the prince. Oddone lived the last four years of his life in Genoa. The prince chose Genoa for his residence for its mild climate that benefited his ailing physical condition.

As a scholar, the prince had come into contact with leading cultural figures, including the sculptor Santo Varni, who served as his adviser and friend, Tammar Luxoro, and Pasquale Domenico Cambiaso. Oddone died at age 19 at the Royal Palace of Genoa shortly before dawn on 22 January 1866.

Ancestry

References

Bibliography
 "Odone of Savoy 1846-1866. Collections of a prince for Genoa", Mazzotta, Milan, 1996.

1866 deaths
1846 births
Burials at the Basilica of Superga
Dukes of Montferrat
Nobility from Turin
Italian philanthropists
Italian princes
Nobility from Genoa
Princes of Savoy
Royalty and nobility with disabilities
Victor Emmanuel II of Italy
Sons of kings